Avramovo is the name of several settlements in Bulgaria:

 Avramovo, Blagoevgrad Province
 Avramovo, Kardzhali Province